Lacy Herman Thornburg (born December 20, 1929) is an American lawyer and retired United States district judge of the United States District Court for the Western District of North Carolina. He served as the North Carolina attorney general from 1985 to 1993.

Education and career
Thornburg was born in Charlotte, North Carolina. He received a Bachelor of Arts degree from the University of North Carolina in 1952. He received a Juris Doctor from the University of North Carolina School of Law in 1954. He was in the United States Army as a Private First Class from 1947 to 1948. He was in private practice of law in Webster, North Carolina from 1954 to 1967. He was a Member of the North Carolina House of Representatives from 1961 to 1966. He was a Special judge of the Superior Court of the 30th Judicial District of North Carolina from 1967 to 1971. He was a Resident judge of the Superior Court of the 30th Judicial District of North Carolina from 1971 to 1983. He was the state attorney general of State of North Carolina from 1985 to 1992. He was an Emergency judge of the Superior Court of the 30th Judicial District of North Carolina from 1993 to 1994. He was a Consultant for the National Indian Gaming Commission from 1994 to 1995.

Gubernatorial campaign
In 1992, he unsuccessfully ran as a Democrat for Governor of North Carolina. He was defeated in the primary by former governor Jim Hunt, who went on to win the general election.

Federal judicial service
Thornburg was a United States District Judge of the United States District Court for the Western District of North Carolina. Thornburg was nominated by President Bill Clinton on January 11, 1995, to a seat vacated by Robert D. Potter. He was confirmed by the United States Senate on March 17, 1995, and received commission the same day. He retired on August 31, 2009.

Personal life
A stretch of U.S. Highway 23 in North Carolina is named for Thornburg. He is the father of Alan Z. Thornburg.

References

External links

 Appearances at the U.S. Supreme Court from the Oyez Project

1929 births
Living people
Politicians from Charlotte, North Carolina
Mars Hill University alumni
University of North Carolina School of Law alumni
North Carolina Attorneys General
North Carolina state court judges
Democratic Party members of the North Carolina House of Representatives
Judges of the United States District Court for the Western District of North Carolina
United States district court judges appointed by Bill Clinton
Lawyers from Charlotte, North Carolina
20th-century American judges
21st-century American judges
United States Army soldiers
Members of American gaming commissions